NA-205 Naushahro Feroze-I is a constituency for the National Assembly of Pakistan.

Election 2002 

General elections were held on 10 Oct 2002. Syed Zafar Ali Shah of PPP won by 76,470 votes.

Election 2008 

General elections were held on 18 Feb 2008. Syed Zafar Ali Shah of PPP won by 98,999 votes.

Election 2013 

General elections were held on 11 May 2013. Asghar Ali Shah of PPP won by 93,884 votes and became the  member of National Assembly.

Election 2018 

General elections are scheduled to be held on 25 July 2018.

See also
NA-204 Khairpur-III
NA-206 Naushahro Feroze-II

References

External links 
Election result's official website

NA-212